Caren Jungjohann (born 23 December 1967 in Duisburg, Nordrhein-Westfalen) is a former field hockey player from Germany, who was a member of the Women's National Team that won the silver medal at the 1992 Summer Olympics in Barcelona, Spain. She competed in two consecutive Summer Olympics for her native country, starting in 1988 for West Germany.

References
 databaseOlympics

External links
 

1967 births
Living people
German female field hockey players
Field hockey players at the 1988 Summer Olympics
Field hockey players at the 1992 Summer Olympics
Olympic field hockey players of Germany
Olympic silver medalists for Germany
Sportspeople from Duisburg
Place of birth missing (living people)
Olympic medalists in field hockey
Medalists at the 1992 Summer Olympics